Sarah D. Stoddard (July 23, 1820 - March 4, 1891)  (Sarah D. Hazen) was an American educator who served as the fourth president (referred to at that time as "acting principal") of Mount Holyoke College (then Mount Holyoke Female Seminary)  from 1865 to 1867.  She graduated from Mount Holyoke in 1841 and taught there for eight years before becoming Head.

See also
Presidents of Mount Holyoke College

References

External links
Biography

1820 births
1891 deaths
Mount Holyoke College alumni
Mount Holyoke College faculty
Presidents and Principals of Mount Holyoke College